The 1996 Badminton World Cup was the eighteenth edition of an international tournament Badminton World Cup. The event was held at the Istora Senayan in Jakarta, Indonesia from 11 to 15 December 1996 with a total prize money of US$185,000. Indonesia won 3 titles, while China finished with the titles in 2 disciplines.

Medalists

Men's singles

Finals

Women's singles

Finals

Men's doubles

Finals

Women's doubles

Finals

Mixed doubles

Finals

References 

Badminton World Cup
1996 in badminton
1996 in Indonesian sport
Sports competitions in Jakarta
International sports competitions hosted by Indonesia